The Game Audio Network Guild Awards (shortened to the G.A.N.G. Awards) is an award show that celebrates excellence in video game audio. The awards, which started in 2004, are arranged by the Game Audio Network Guild and held annually during the Game Developers Conference in San Francisco. The first four shows were held at the Fairmont San Jose, before moving to the Moscone Center from the fifth; due to the COVID-19 pandemic, the 18th, 19th, and 20th ceremonies were held virtually.

Format 
The Game Audio Network Guild (G.A.N.G.) Awards are celebrated annually as part of the Game Developers Conference in San Francisco. The awards are split between music, sound design, and voice acting. Submissions must be released between January 1 and December 31 of the preceding year. Early access games are ineligible. After the submission deadline passes, the Awards Committee sends the data to the Advisors and Awards Committees to select the nominees. Once the final nominations are selected, the Game Audio Network Guild votes for the winners.

Ceremonies

1st (2003) 

[[File:Nobuo uematsu 001.jpg|thumb|150px|right|Nobuo Uematsu won Best Original Vocal Song – Choral for "Memoro de la Santono from Final Fantasy XI.]]

The first G.A.N.G. Awards ceremony took place on March 7, 2003, at the Fairmont San Jose. Almost 500 people attended the ceremony. The awards were presented by members of the Game Audio Network guild, including Tommy Tallarico, Clint Bajakian, and Jack Wall, with musical interludes from LoudLouderLoudest!, Orpheus Hanley, the Slackmates, the Ex Lucas Arts Boys, and George "The Fat Man" Sanger.

 Overall 
 Audio of the Year: Medal of Honor: Frontline Best Cinematic/Cut-Scene Audio: Warcraft III: Reign of Chaos Best Audio – Other: Fisher-Price Pixter Pro Base and Leap Frog Imagination Desk Reading Games (tie)
 Best Handheld Audio: Alienators: Evolution Continues Best Website Audio: Blitz Digital Studios
 Best Edutainment/Children Audio: Learning 2nd/3rd Grade Music 
 Music of the Year: Medal of Honor: Frontline Best Live Performance Recording: "Operation Market Garden" — Medal of Honor: Frontline Best Interactive Score: James Bond 007: Nightfire Best Instrumental Song: "Allied Assault Main Theme" by Michael Giacchino — Medal of Honor: Allied Assault Best Original Vocal Song – Choral: "Memoro de la Santono" by Nobuo Uematsu — Final Fantasy XI Best Original Vocal Song – Pop: "Kingdom (Vocal Version)" by Hikaru Utada — Kingdom Hearts Best Use of Licensed Music: Grand Theft Auto: Vice City Best Original Soundtrack Album: The Best of LucasArts Best Arrangement of a Non-Original Score: James Bond 007: Nightfire Sound Design 
 Sound Design of the Year: Medal of Honor: Frontline Best Sound Design in a Sports or Driving Game: FIFA World Cup 2002 Best Use of Multi-Channel Surround in a Game: James Bond 007: Nightfire Voice Acting 
 Best Dialogue: Grand Theft Auto: Vice City Best Commentary in a Sports Game: Madden NFL 2003 Industry and Trade 
 Best New Audio Technology: XACT
 Best Audio Software: Steinberg Cubase SX
 Best Audio Hardware: Digidesign Digi002
 Best Sound Library: Vienna Symphonic Library Orchestral Cube

 Recognition 
 Most Innovative Use of Audio: SOCOM U.S. Navy SEALs Best Game Audio Article, Publication or Broadcast: "The Use and Effectiveness of Audio in Halo: Game Music Evolved" by Marty O'Donnell, Aaron Marks, and Greg O'Connor-Read
 G.A.N.G. Recognition Award: Music4Games and Headhunter Lifetime Achievement Award: Mark Miller
 Rookie of the Year: Shane Kneip
 Best Audio Programmer: Buzz Burrowes
 Best Producer/Designer: Dan Irish
 Distinguished G.A.N.G. Service Awards: Sach Jobbs, Jay Samerad, Todd Fay, and Mike Tallarico
 G.A.N.G. Contest Winners: Sam Hulick (songwriting), and Rob King (sound design)	

 2nd (2004) 

The second annual G.A.N.G. Awards ceremony took place on March 25, 2004, at the Fairmont San Jose in the Regency Ballroom. Tallarico returned to host the ceremony, which took place over two-and-a-half hours. Musical performances included Steve Kirk and the Voodoo Vince Band, LoudLouderLoudest!, the Rockin' hobbit Band, the OneUp Mushrooms, and Dweezil Zappa.

 Overall 
 Audio of the Year: Call of Duty Best Cinematic/Cut-Scene Audio: Warcraft III: The Frozen Throne Best Audio – Other: LeapFrog Leapster: SpongeBob SquarePants
 Best Handheld Audio: 007: Everything or Nothing Best Website Audio: Shiny Entertainment
 Best Edutainment/Children Audio: Tonka: Rescue Patrol Music 
 Music of the Year: Indiana Jones and the Emperor's Tomb Best Live Performance Recording: Indiana Jones and the Emperor's Tomb Best Interactive Score: Indiana Jones and the Emperor's Tomb Best Original Instrumental Song: "Max Payne Theme" — Max Payne 2: The Fall of Max Payne Best Original Vocal Song – Choral: "Gallery Theme" by Tim Larkin — Uru: Ages Beyond Myst Best Original Vocal Song – Pop: "Late Goodbye" by Poets of the Fall — Max Payne 2: The Fall of Max Payne Best Use of Licensed Music: The Lord of the Rings: The Return of the King Best Original Soundtrack Album: The Hobbit Best Arrangement of a Non-Original Score: Indiana Jones and the Emperor's Tomb Sound Design 
 Sound Design of the Year: Call of Duty Best Sound Design in a Sports or Driving Game: Need for Speed: Underground Best Use of Multi-Channel Surround in a Game: The Lord of the Rings: The Return of the King Voice Acting 
 Best Dialogue: The Getaway Best Commentary in a Sports Game: Madden NFL 2004 Industry and Trade 
 Best New Audio Technology: Yamaha Vocaloid
 Best Audio Software: Spectrasonics Atmosphere & Native Instruments Absynth 2.0
 Best Audio Hardware: Pro Tools HD Accel
 Best Sound Library: Sound Ideas

 Recognition 
 Lifetime Achievement Award: Rob Hubbard
 G.A.N.G. Recognition Awards: Brian O'Connor and Mark Sazer (RMA, Chris Milner and Carol M. Sato (AFM), Escalet, George Aiello, Bill Mitchell
 Rookie of the Year: Cris Velasco and Jared Emerson-Johnson
 Silas Warner Best Audio Programming Award: Thomas Engel (Factor 5)
 Best Producer/Designer: Simon Pressey (Ubisoft)
 Most Innovative Use of Audio: Amplitude (Chuck Doud)
 Best Game Audio Article, Publication or Broadcast: "DirectX 9 Audio Exposed: Interactive Audio Development" by Todd M. Fay
 Distinguished Service Awards: Brian DiDomenico, Jamie Lendino, Jerome Rossen
 G.A.N.G. Contest Winners: Ian Dorsch (composition), Jonathan Wall (sound design)
 Golden Melodica Award: Tommy Tallarico

 3rd (2005) 

The third annual G.A.N.G. Awards ceremony took place on March 10, 2005, at the Fairmont San Jose as part of the Game Developers Conference. Myst IV: Revelation led the winners with three awards.

 Overall 
 Audio of the Year: Halo 2 Best Cinematic/Cut-Scene Audio: Hitman Contracts Best Audio – Other: River Reader Rabbit series for LeapPad
 Best Handheld Audio: Spider-Man 2 Best Website Audio: Speak Getaway
 Best Edutainment/Children Audio: Barbie: Princess and the Pauper Music 
 Music of the Year: Myst IV: Revelation Best Live Performance Recording: Myst IV: Revelation Best Interactive Score: Sly 2: Band of Thieves Best Original Instrumental Song: "Main Theme" by Inon Zur — Men of Valor Best Original Vocal Song – Choral: "Main Theme" by Jack Wall — Myst IV: Revelation Best Original Vocal Song – Pop: "Snake Eater" by Norihiko Hibino — Metal Gear Solid 3: Snake Eater Best Use of Licensed Music: Grand Theft Auto: San Andreas Best Original Soundtrack Album: Halo 2 Best Arrangement of a Non-Original Score: EverQuest II Sound Design 
 Sound Design of the Year: Call of Duty: Finest Hour Best Sound Design in a Sports or Driving Game: ESPN NFL 2K5 Best Use of Multi-Channel Surround in a Game: The Chronicles of Riddick: Escape from Butcher Bay Voice Acting 
 Best Dialogue: Grand Theft Auto: San Andreas Best Commentary in a Sports Game: ESPN NFL 2K5 Industry and Trade 
 Best New Audio Technology: GameCODA 2.0
 Best Audio Software: Nuendo 3.0
 Best Audio Hardware: Spherex Xbox 5.1 Surround Sound System
 Best Sound Library: Quantum Leap Symphonic Orchestra: Platinum Edition

 Recognition 
 Lifetime Achievement Award: Michael Land
 G.A.N.G. Recognition Awards: Didier Lord, Bob Rice, and Steve Schnur
 Rookie of the Year: Tom Salta
 Silas Warner Best Audio Programming Award: John Twigg, Cliff Kondratuik
 Best Producer/Designer: Donald Mustard (GlyphX)
 Most Innovative Use of Audio: Donkey Konga Best Game Audio Article, Publication or Broadcast: "Audio for Games: Planning, Process and Production" by Alexander Brandon
 Distinguished Service Awards: Chris Rickwood, Jonathan Wall, Matt Bielejeski, and Alistair Cooper

 4th (2006) 

The fourth annual G.A.N.G. Awards ceremony took place on March 23, 2006, at the Fairmont San Jose. God of War swept most of the major categories.

 Overall 
 Audio of the Year: God of War Best Cinematic/Cut-Scene Audio: God of War Best Audio – Other: Lumines Music 
 Music of the Year: God of War Best Live Performance Recording: God of War Best Interactive Score: God of War Best Original Instrumental Song: "The Tragic Hero" by Chance Thomas — Peter Jackson's King Kong Best Original Vocal Song – Choral: "Muse by Tommy Tallarico — Advent Rising Best Original Vocal Song – Pop: "Katamari on the Swing" by Yuri Misumi, Hiroshi Okubo, Masashi Sugiyama, Katsuro Tajima, Hideki Tobeta, Akitata Toyama, Yoshihito Yano, Tomomitsu Kaneko, and Kanako Kakino — We Love Katamari Best Use of Licensed Music: Guitar Hero Best Original Soundtrack Album: Jade Empire Best Arrangement of a Non-Original Score: The Nightmare Before Christmas: Oogie's Revenge Sound Design 
 Sound Design of the Year: God of War Best Sound Design in a Sports or Driving Game: Need for Speed: Most Wanted Best Use of Multi-Channel Surround in a Game: Call of Duty 2 Voice Acting 
 Best Dialogue: God of War Industry and Trade 
 Best New Audio Technology: XMA
 Best Audio Software: Spectrasonics Stylus RMX — Real Time Groove Module
 Best Audio Hardware: M-Audio MicroTrack 24/96
 Best Sound Library: East West/Quantum Leap Symphonic Choirs

 Recognition 
 Lifetime Achievement Award: Bobby Prince
 G.A.N.G. Recognition Awards: Nile Rodgers and Jim Charne
 Rookie of the Year: Gerard Marino
 Student/Apprentice Competition: Wilbert Roget (music), and Carsten Rojahn (sound design)
 Most Innovative Use of Audio: Guitar Hero Best Game Audio Article, Publication or Broadcast: "The Treatment of Music in Games" by Jim Charne
 Distinguished Service Awards: Paul Lipson, Mark Guleno, Shiloh Hobel, Jerry Lyons, and Michelle Sorger

 5th (2007) 

The fifth annual G.A.N.G. Awards ceremony took place on March 8, 2007, at the Moscone Center in San Francisco.

 Overall 
 Audio of the Year: Gears of War Best Cinematic/Cut-Scene Audio: Gears of War Best Audio – Other: Cartoon Network's Re-Animated: Fit to be Pied Music 
 Music of the Year: Tomb Raider: Legend Best Interactive Score: Need for Speed: Carbon Best Original Instrumental Song: "Titan" by Tilman Sillescu and Pierre Langer — Paraworld Best Original Vocal Song – Choral: "Baby Yetu" by Christopher Tin — Civilization IV Best Original Vocal Song – Pop: "Dr. Kunckle's Funnkle Cake" by Jesse Harlin and David W. Collins — Thrillville Best Use of Licensed Music: Guitar Hero II Best Original Soundtrack Album: Halo 2: Volume Two Best Arrangement of a Non-Original Score: The Godfather and Onimusha: Dawn of Dreams (tie)

 Sound Design 
 Sound Design of the Year: Gears of War Best Use of Multi-Channel Surround in a Game: Call of Duty 3 Voice Acting 
 Best Dialogue: 24: The Game Recognition 
 Lifetime Achievement Award: Koji Kondo
 G.A.N.G. Recognition Awards: Audiokinetic and Gene Semel
 Rookie of the Year: Christopher Tin
 Student Contest Winners: JJ Lee (music composition), Vince Iannelli (sound design)
 Student/Apprentice Competition Winners: Ivo Ivanov and Ryan John
 Distinguished Service Awards: Scott Gershin, David Murrant, and Scott Selfon
 Most Innovative Use of Audio: Guitar Hero II Best Game Audio Article, Publication or Broadcast: "2006 GDC Audio Boot Camp" by Scott Selfon

 6th (2008) 

The sixth annual G.A.N.G. Awards ceremony took place on February 21, 2008, in the North Hall of the Moscone Center in San Francisco. BioShock swept the ceremony, winning all eight awards for which it was nominated. At the ceremony, a  scholarship to Ex'pression College for Digital Arts was awarded to guild member Nathan Rain Schwartz. According to Tallarico, the guild's advisory board took over a month to decide final nominees.

 Overall 
 Audio of the Year: BioShock Best Cinematic/Cut-Scene Audio: BioShock Best Audio – Other: Jewel Quest II Best Handheld Audio: Syphon Filter: Logan's Shadow Music 
 Music of the Year: BioShock Best Interactive Score: BioShock Best Original Instrumental Song: "Welcome to Rapture" — BioShock Best Original Vocal Song – Choral: "Main Titles" — God of War II Best Original Vocal Song – Pop: "Still Alive" — Portal Best Use of Licensed Music: BioShock Best Original Soundtrack Album: God of War II Best Arrangement of a Non-Original Score: The Simpsons Game Sound Design 
 Sound Design of the Year: BioShock Best Use of Multi-Channel Surround in a Game: Halo 3 Voice Acting 
 Best Dialogue: BioShock Recognition 
 Lifetime Achievement Award: Brian L. Schmidt
 G.A.N.G. Recognition Awards: Russell Brower, Rod Abernathy, and Michael "Piano Squall" Gluck
 Rookie of the Year: Austin Wintory and Tomas Neumann
 Student/Apprentice Competition Winners: Mike "Skitch" Schichiano (music) and Mikkel Eskessen (sound design)
 Most Innovative Use of Audio: Tom Clancy's Ghost Recon Advanced Warfighter 2 Best Game Audio Article, Publication or Broadcast: "The World of Game Composing" — Film Music Magazine Distinguished Service Awards: Sean Beeson, Jerry Lyons, Chance Thomas, and Becky Young

 7th (2009) 

The seventh annual G.A.N.G. Awards were held on March 26, 2009, in the North Hall of the Moscone Center as part of the Game Developers Conference. LittleBigPlanet led the nominees with eight nominations. Dead Space won Audio of the Year and Sound Design of the Year, while Afrika won Music of the Year; Wataru Hokoyama, composer of the latter, won Rookie of the Year. Votes were conducted by the 800 members of the guild across 30 countries.

 Overall 
 Audio of the Year: Dead Space Best Cinematic/Cut-Scene Audio: World of Warcraft: Wrath of the Lich King and Gears of War 2 (tie)
 Best Audio – Other: Watchmen: Motion Comic Best Handheld Audio: God of War: Chains of Olympus Music 
 Music of the Year: Afrika Best Interactive Score: LittleBigPlanet Best Original Instrumental Song: "The Garden" — LittleBigPlanet and "Main Theme" — Afrika (tie)
 Best Original Vocal Song – Choral: "Main Title" — World of Warcraft: Wrath of the Lich King Best Original Vocal Song – Pop: "Still Alive" — Mirror's Edge Best Use of Licensed Music: Rock Band 2 Best Original Soundtrack Album: Video Games Live: Volume One Sound Design 
 Sound Design of the Year: Dead Space Best Use of Multi-Channel Surround in a Game: Left 4 Dead Voice Acting 
 Best Dialogue: Grand Theft Auto IV Recognition 
 Lifetime Achievement Award: Bob Rice
 G.A.N.G. Recognition Awards: Jim Charne and John Broomhall
 Student/Apprentice Competition Winners: Tom Graczkowski (music composition) and Benoit Babin (sound design)
 Rookie of the Year: Wataru Hokoyama
 Best Game Audio Article, Publication or Broadcast: "The Complete Guide to Game Audio" by Aaron Marks
 Distinguished Service Awards: Richard Jacques, Tom Salta, and Stephen Years

 8th (2010) 

The eighth annual G.A.N.G. Awards were held on March 11, 2010, at the Moscone Center. Assassin's Creed II and Uncharted 2: Among Thieves led the nominations with nine each.

 Overall 
 Audio of the Year: Uncharted 2: Among Thieves Best Cinematic/Cut-Scene Audio: Uncharted 2: Among Thieves Best Handheld Audio: The Secret of Monkey Island: Special Edition Music 
 Music of the Year: Assassin's Creed II and Uncharted 2: Among Thieves (tie)
 Best Interactive Score: Flower Best Original Instrumental Song: "Reunion" — Uncharted 2: Among Thieves Best Original Vocal Song – Choral: "Halls of Iron" — World of Warcraft: Secrets of Ulduar Best Original Vocal Song – Pop: "Plants vs. Zombies" — Plants vs. Zombies Best Use of Licensed Music: Rock Band: The Beatles Best Original Soundtrack Album: Infamous Sound Design 
 Sound Design of the Year: Uncharted 2: Among Thieves Best Use of Multi-Channel Surround in a Game: Call of Duty: Modern Warfare 2 Voice Acting 
 Best Dialogue: Uncharted 2: Among Thieves Recognition 
 Lifetime Achievement Award: Charles Deenen
 G.A.N.G. Recognition Awards: Brian L. Schmidt
 Student/Apprentice Competition Winners: Courtney Johns (music composition) and Jeff Schmidt (sound design)
 Rookie of the Year: Dave Johnson and Camden Stoddard
 Best Game Audio Article, Publication or Broadcast: "The Future of Game Audio / The Game Audio Mixing Revolution" (Gamasutra)
 Distinguished Service Awards: Rob Bridgett, Morla Gorrondona, Chip Beeman, Alexander Brandon, and David Chan

 9th (2011) 

The ninth annual G.A.N.G. Awards were held on March 3, 2011, at the Moscone Center during the Game Developers Conference. The final nominees were decided upon by a 70-person advisory committee, while the winners received votes from the members of the Game Audio Network Guild. More than 350 submissions were considered by the committee across the 14 categories. Red Dead Redemption led the show with ten nominations and five wins.

 Overall 
 Audio of the Year: Red Dead Redemption Best Cinematic/Cut-Scene Audio: Starcraft II Best Audio – Other: Halo: Waypoint Best Handheld Audio: Monkey Island 2: LeChuck's Revenge Special Edition Music 
 Music of the Year: Red Dead Redemption Best Interactive Score: Red Dead Redemption Best Original Instrumental Song: "Athens Harbour Chase" — James Bond 007: Blood Stone Best Original Vocal Song – Choral: "Invincible" — World of Warcraft: Cataclysm Best Original Vocal Song – Pop: "I'll Take It All" — James Bond 007: Blood Stone Best Use of Licensed Music: BioShock 2 Best Original Soundtrack Album: Video Games Live: Level Two Sound Design 
 Sound Design of the Year: Battlefield: Bad Company 2 Best Use of Multi-Channel Surround in a Game: Battlefield: Bad Company 2 Voice Acting 
 Best Dialogue: Red Dead Redemption Recognition 
 Lifetime Achievement Award: Chris Huelsbeck
 G.A.N.G. Recognition Awards: Sumthing Else Musicworks
 Student/Apprentice Competition Winners: Paolo Amati (music composition) and Adam Raley (sound design)
 Rookie of the Year: Bill Elm and Woody Jackson
 Best Game Audio Article, Publication or Broadcast: "The Weight of Silence — How Silence Can Indicate a Character's Importance" by Jesse Harlin
 Distinguished Service Awards: Dren McDonald and Jacquie Shriver

 10th (2012) 

The tenth annual G.A.N.G. Awards were held on March 3, 2012, at the Moscone Center. Battlefield 3 won the most awards, with three wins, while Bastion, Portal 2, and Star Wars: The Old Republic won two awards each.

 Overall 
 Audio of the Year: Battlefield 3 Best Cinematic/Cut-Scene Audio: Uncharted 3: Drake's Deception Best Audio in a Casual/Indie/Social Game: Bastion Best Handheld Audio: Infinity Blade II Music 
 Music of the Year: L.A. Noire Best Interactive Score: Kinect: Disneyland Adventures and Portal 2 (tie)
 Best Original Instrumental Song: "Glory, The Galactic Republic" — Star Wars: The Old Republic Best Original Vocal Song – Choral: "Main Theme" — The Elder Scrolls V: Skyrim Best Original Vocal Song – Pop: "Want You Gone" — Portal 2 Best Use of Licensed Music: Kinect Disneyland Adventures Best Original Soundtrack Album: Star Wars: The Old Republic — Collector's Edition Soundtrack Sound Design 
 Sound Design of the Year: Battlefield 3 Best Use of Multi-Channel Surround in a Game: Battlefield 3 Voice Acting 
 Best Dialogue: Portal 2 Recognition 
 Lifetime Achievement Award: Tommy Tallarico
 G.A.N.G. Recognition Awards Kevin Riepl
 Student/Apprentice Competition Winners: Nathaniel Tronrud (music) and Matthew Chastney (sound design)
 Rookie of the Year: Darren Korb
 Best Game Audio Article, Publication or Broadcast: "The Use of Voice in Portal 2"

 11th (2013) 

The eleventh annual G.A.N.G. Awards were held on March 28, 2013, at the Moscone Center. The show was recorded and broadcast via Twitch.

 Overall 
 Audio of the Year: Diablo III Best Cinematic/Cut-Scene Audio: Halo 4 
 Best Handheld Audio: Uncharted: Golden Abyss Best Audio Mix: Far Cry 3 Best Audio in a Casual/Indie/Social Game: Unfinished Swan Music 
 Music of the Year: Journey Best Interactive Score: Journey Best Original Instrumental Song: "Apotheosis" by Austin Wintory — Journey Best Original Vocal Song – Choral: "Main Theme" by Winifred Phillips — Assassin's Creed: Liberation Best Original Vocal Song – Pop: "I Was Born For This" — Journey Best Use of Licensed Music: LittleBigPlanet Karting Best Original Soundtrack Album: Journey Sound Design and Voice Acting 
 Sound Design of the Year: Halo 4 Best Dialogue: Far Cry 3 and The Walking Dead (tie)

 Recognition 
 Lifetime Achievement Award: Clint Bajakian
 G.A.N.G. Recognition Award: Chance Thomas
 Student/Apprentice Competition Winners: Anastasia Devana (music composition) and Logan Byers (sound design)
 Rookie of the Year: Joel Corelitz and Jessica Curry
 Best Game Audio Article, Publication or Broadcast: "All in the Mix: The Importance of Real-Time Mixing in Video Games" by Garry Taylor
 Distinguished Service Awards: Alexander Davis

 12th (2014) 

The twelfth annual G.A.N.G. Awards were held on March 20, 2014, at the Moscone Center. The show was recorded and broadcast via Twitch. The Last of Us led the awards with three wins, while BioShock Infinite received two.

 Overall 
 Audio of the Year: The Last of Us Best Handheld Audio: Tearaway Best Cinematic Cutscene Audio: Starcraft II: Heart of the Swarm Best Audio Mix: The Last of Us Best Audio in a Casual/Indie/Social Game: Peggle 2 Music 
 Music of the Year: BioShock Infinite Best Interactive Score: Peggle 2 Best Original Instrumental Song: "Lighter Than Air" — BioShock Infinite Best Original Vocal Song – Choral: "Dieses Herz" — Amnesia: A Machine for Pigs Best Original Vocal Song – Pop: "Orchid's Theme" — Killer Instinct Best Use of Licensed Music: BioShock Infinite Best Original Soundtrack Album: Beyond: Two Souls and Halo: Spartan Assault (tie)

 Sound Design and Voice Acting 
 Sound Design of the Year: The Last of Us Best Dialogue: The Last of Us Recognition 
 G.A.N.G. Recognition Awards: Brandon Cole and Eugene Jarvis
 Lifetime Achievement Award: David Warhol and Andrew Kane
 Student/Apprentice Competition Winners: PJ Tracy (music composition) and Andrew Villa (sound design)
 Best Game Audio Article, Publication or Broadcast: "GDC Boot Camp XII"

 13th (2015) 

The thirteenth annual G.A.N.G. Awards were held on March 5, 2015, at the Moscone Center. George "The Fat Man" Sanger received two standing ovations as he accepted his Lifetime Achievement Award.

 Overall 
 Audio of the Year: Call of Duty: Advanced Warfare Best Cinematic/Cutscene Audio: The Last of Us: Left Behind Best Handheld Audio: Hearthstone: Heroes of Warcraft and Peggle Blast (tie)
 Best Audio for an Indie Game: The Banner Saga and Transistor (tie)
 Best Audio Mix: Alien: Isolation Music 
 Music of the Year: Destiny Best Interactive Score: Hohokum Best Original Instrumental: "Halo Theme Gungnir Mix" — Halo 2 Anniversary Best Original Vocal Song – Choral: "The Traveler/Excerpt from The Hope" — Destiny Best Original Vocal Song – Pop: "Hope for the Future" — Destiny Best Music in a Casual/Social Game: Peggle Blast Best Game Music Cover/Remix: The String Arcade Sound Design 
 Sound Design of the Year: Call of Duty: Advanced Warfare Best Sound Design in a Casual/Social Game: Hearthstone: Heroes of Warcraft Voice Acting 
 Best Dialogue: South Park: The Stick of Truth Recognition 
 G.A.N.G. Recognition Award: Emily Reese
 Student/Apprentice Competition Winners: George Shaw (music) and Thomas Couchard (sound design)
 Distinguished Service Awards: Richard Savery
 Lifetime Achievement Award: George "The Fat Man" Sanger
 Best Game Audio Article, Publication or Broadcast: "The Mix in The Last of Us"

 14th (2016) 

The fourteenth annual G.A.N.G. Awards were held on March 17, 2016, at the Moscone Center. Everybody's Gone to the Rapture led the nominees with six nominations, followed by Star Wars Battlefront with five and Ori and the Blind Forest with four.

 Overall 
 Audio of the Year: Ori and the Blind Forest Best Cinematic/Cutscene Audio: Starcraft II: Legacy of the Void Best Handheld Audio: Halo: Spartan Strike Best Audio for an Indie Game: Gathering Sky Best Audio Mix: Ori and the Blind Forest and Star Wars Battlefront (tie)

 Music 
 Music of the Year: Star Wars Battlefront Best Interactive Score: Star Wars Battlefront Best Original Instrumental: "Main Theme" — Ori and the Blind Forest Best Original Vocal Song – Choral: "The Light We Cast" — Everybody's Gone to the Rapture Best Original Vocal Song – Pop: "The Mourning Tree" — Everybody's Gone to the Rapture Best Original Soundtrack Album: Everybody's Gone to the Rapture Best Music in a Casual/Social Game: Honor of Kings Best Game Music Cover/Remix: "Underground" (Assassin's Creed Syndicate) by Peter Hollens

 Sound Design 
 Sound Design of the Year: Star Wars Battlefront Best Sound Design in a Casual/Social Game: Gathering Sky Voice Acting 
 Best Dialogue: Everybody's Gone to the Rapture Recognition 
 Rookie of the Year: Gareth Coker
 G.A.N.G. Recognition Award: Penka Kouneva
 Distinguished Service Awards: Savina Ciaramella and Chance Thomas
 Lifetime Achievement Award: Marty O'Donnell
 Best Game Audio Article, Publication or Broadcast: "Gathering Sky — Audio Journals 1-3" by Dren McDonald

 15th (2017) 

The fifteenth annual G.A.N.G. Awards were held on March 23, 2017, at the Moscone Center.

 Overall 
 Audio of the Year: Uncharted 4: A Thief's End Best Cinematic/Cutscene Audio: Uncharted 4: A Thief's End Best Handheld Audio: Hearthstone: One Night in Karazhan Best Audio for an Indie Game: Inside Best Audio Mix: Uncharted 4: A Thief's End Music 
 Music of the Year: Abzû Best Interactive Score: Fossil Echo Best Original Instrumental: The Last Guardian Best Original Vocal Song – Choral: "Then Were Created the Gods in the Mist of Heaven" — Abzû Best Original Vocal Song – Pop: "Our Steps, To the Night" — The Banner Saga 2 Best Original Soundtrack Album: Abzû Best Music in a Casual/Social Game: "Realm of Valor" — Strike of Kings Best Game Music Cover/Remix: "Fated Children"

 Sound Design 
 Sound Design of the Year: Overwatch Best Sound Design in a Casual/Social Game: Hearthstone: One Night in Karazhan Voice Acting 
 Best Dialogue: Uncharted 4: A Thief's End Recognition 
 Rookie of the Year: John Robert Matz and Mikel Shane Prather
 G.A.N.G. Ambassador Award: Karen Collins
 G.A.N.G. Recognition Award: Liza Salta
 Distinguished Service Award: Stephan Schütze
 Lifetime Achievement Award: Peter McConnell
 Best Game Audio Article, Publication or Broadcast: "Overwatch — The Elusive Goal: Play by Sound"

 16th (2018) 

The sixteenth annual G.A.N.G. Awards were held on March 22, 2018, at the Moscone Center during the Game Developers Conference.

 Overall 
 Audio of the Year: Cuphead Best Cinematic/Cutscene Audio: Uncharted: The Lost Legacy Best Audio Mix: Uncharted: The Lost Legacy Best VR Audio: Resident Evil 7: Biohazard Music 
 Music of the Year: Call of Duty: WWII Best Interactive Score: Call of Duty: WWII Best Original Instrumental: "A Brotherhood of Heroes" (Call of Duty: WWII) and Horizon Zero Dawn (tie)
 Best Original Song: "Hearthstone is Home" — Hearthstone Best Original Choral Composition: Horizon Zero Dawn Best Original Soundtrack Album: Call of Duty: WWII Best Music in a Casual/Social Game: So Let Us Melt Best Music for an Indie Game: So Let Us Melt Best Game Music Cover/Remix: "Sword of Destiny" — The Witcher 3 Sound Design 
 Sound Design of the Year: Call of Duty: WWII Best Sound Design in a Casual/Social Game: So Let Us Melt Best Sound Design for an Indie Game: Hellblade: Senua's Sacrifice Voice Acting 
 Best Dialogue: Uncharted: The Lost Legacy Recognition 
 Extraordinary Leadership and Service: Brian L. Schmidt
 Breakout Talent of the Year: Kristofer Maddigan
 G.A.N.G. Recognition Award: Sally-Anne Kellaway
 Distinguished Service Award: Spencer Bambrick
 Lifetime Achievement Award: Richard Jacques

 17th (2019) 

The seventeenth annual G.A.N.G. Awards were held on March 21, 2019, at the Moscone Center. God of War led the winners with six awards.

 Overall 
 Audio of the Year: God of War Best Cinematic/Cutscene Audio: God of War Best Audio Mix: God of War Best VR Audio: Moss G.A.N.G. / MAGFEST People's Choice Award: Celeste and Octopath Traveler (tie)

 Music 
 Music of the Year: God of War Best Original Soundtrack Album: Shadow of the Tomb Raider Best Interactive Score: Shadow of the Tomb Raider Best Original Instrumental: "Kara Main Theme" — Detroit: Become Human Best Music in a Casual/Social Game: Hearthstone: The Boomsday Project Best Music for an Indie Game: Moss Best Original Song: "Waiting" — Battle Through the Heaven Best Original Choral Composition: "Lullaby of the Giants" — God of War Best Game Music Cover/Remix: "Super Mario Bros." — ConSoul

 Sound Design 
 Sound Design of the Year: God of War Best Sound Design in a Casual/Social Game: Hearthstone: The Boomsday Project Best Sound Design for an Indie Game: Moss Voice Acting 
 Best Dialogue: Marvel's Spider-Man Recognition 
 G.A.N.G. Recognition Award: Damian Kastbauer
 Distinguished Service Award: Becky Allen
 Lifetime Achievement Award: Elise Baldwin
 Best Game Audio Article, Publication or Broadcast: "Soundworks Collection Video: Shadow of the Tomb Raider" by Michael Coleman, Rob Bridgett, Frédéric Arnaud, Hugo Léger, Anne-Sophie Mongeau, Brian D'Oliveira

 18th (2020) 

The eighteenth annual G.A.N.G. Awards were held on May 6, 2020. Due to the COVID-19 pandemic, the event was held virtually for the first time. It was hosted by Wilbert Roget, II and Cody Matthew Johnson, and had a pre- and post-show. Death Stranding swept the show with six wins, including Audio of the Year, Sound Design of the Year, and Best Dialogue.

 Overall 
 Audio of the Year: Death Stranding Best Cinematic/Cutscene Audio: Death Stranding Best Virtual Reality Audio: Journey of the Gods Best Audio Mix: Call of Duty: Modern Warfare and Death Stranding (tie)
 G.A.N.G. / MAFEST People's Choice Award: Cadence of Hyrule Music 
 Music of the Year: Star Wars Jedi: Fallen Order Best Interactive Score: Erica Best Music for an Indie Game: Bee Simulator Best Original Instrumental: "Erica Know Thyself" by Austin Wintory — Erica Best Original Song: "Giants" by Jared Lee, Jessica Karpov, Kole Hicks, Umar Ibrahim — League of Legends Best Original Choral Composition: "Cordova's Theme" by Gordy Haab and Stephen Barton — Star Wars Jedi: Fallen Order Best Original Soundtrack Album: Death Stranding Best Music in a Casual/Social Game: Honor of Kings 2.0 Best Game Music Cover/Remix: "The Trial" (Chrono Trigger) by John Robert Matz

 Sound Design 
 Sound Design of the Year: Death Stranding Best Sound Design in a Casual/Social Game: Call of Duty: Mobile Best Sound Design for an Indie Game: Deliver Us the Moon Voice Acting 
 Best Dialogue: Death Stranding Best Dialogue for an Indie Game: Golem Recognition 
 Breakout Talent Award: Laryssa Okada
 G.A.N.G. Recognition Award: Guy Whitmore
 Distinguished Service Award: Emmanuel Lagumbay
 Best Game Audio Article, Publication or Broadcast: "100 Unusual, Novel, Surprising Ways to be a Better Sound Designer in Video Games" by Rob Bridgett

 19th (2021) 

The nineteenth annual G.A.N.G. Awards took place on April 28, 2021. Due to COVID-19 pandemic, the show was held virtually for the second time, hosted by Rachel Ribison and Cody Matthew Johnson. Musical guests included the Video Game Orchestra and 88bit. The Last of Us Part II led the show with 15 nominations and eight wins, followed by Ghost of Tsushima with 14 nominations and five wins, Hades with 12 nominations and three wins, and Marvel's Spider-Man: Miles Morales with 11 nominations. Guy Whitmore received the Lifetime Achievement Award.

 Overall 
 Audio of the Year: The Last of Us Part II Best Audio for a Casual or Social Game: Game for Peace: Meteor Strike Best Audio for an Indie Game: Hades Best New Original IP Audio: Ghost of Tsushima Best Cinematic and Cutscene Audio: Final Fantasy VII Remake Best Game Trailer Audio: Cyberpunk 2077 Excellence in Audio Accessibility: The Last of Us Part II Excellence in VR Audio: Half-Life: Alyx, The Last Light, and The Walking Dead: Saints & Sinners (tie)
 Best Audio Mix: The Last of Us Part II Music 
 Music of the Year: Star Wars: Squadrons Creative and Technical Achievement in Music: Ghost of Tsushima Best Music for an Indie Game: The Pathless Best Original Soundtrack Album: Mythgard Best Physical Soundtrack Release: The Music of Destiny: Volume II Collector's Edition Vinyl Box Set Best Main Theme: "Main Theme" by Kazumi Totaka — Animal Crossing: New Horizons Best Original Song: "More", music by Rebecca Johnson, Sebastien Najand, Riot Music Team, and Bekuh BOOM; performed by K/DA ((G)I-dle, Jaira Burns, Lexie Liu, Madison Beer, and Seraphine) — League of Legends 
 Best Game Music Cover or Remix: "嘘でしょ！コンビは熊と鳥！？(It Can’t Be True! A Bear and a Bird Working Together?!)" by Jeff Penny

 Sound Design 
 Sound Design of the Year: Ghost of Tsushima and The Last of Us Part II (tie)
 Creative and Technical Achievement in Sound Design: The Last of Us Part II Best Game Foley: Ghost of Tsushima Best Sound Design for an Indie Game: Hades Best UI, Reward or Objective Sound Design: Animal Crossing: New Horizons Voice Acting 
 Dialogue of the Year: The Last of Us Part II Best Dialogue for an Indie Game: Hades Best Voice Performance: Kazuya Nakai as Jin Sakai — Ghost of Tsushima Best Ensemble Cast Performance: The Last of Us Part II Best Non-Humanoid Performance: Bugsnax Recognition 
 Best Game Audio Article or Publication: The Last of Us Part II Sound Interview — A Sound Effect Best Game Audio Presentation, Podcast or Broadcast: "How to Get Hired a Second Time" by Jesse Harlin — GameSoundCon 2020

 20th (2022) 

The twentieth annual G.A.N.G. Awards took place on May 25, 2022. Due to COVID-19 pandemic, the show was held virtually for the third time, hosted by Jason E. Kelley. Musical guests included 88bit and Raphael Batista. Call of Duty: Vanguard led the nominees with ten nominations, and Ratchet & Clank: Rift Apart led the winners with four awards, including Audio of the Year. Leslie Ann Jones won the Lifetime Achievement Award, and G.A.N.G. vice president Sabrina Hutchinson won the Distinguished Service Award.

 Overall 
 Audio of the Year: Ratchet & Clank: Rift Apart Best Audio for a Casual or Social Game: Honor of Kings Best Audio for an Indie Game: Unpacking Best New Original IP Audio: Returnal Best Cinematic and Cutscene Audio: Returnal Best Game Trailer Audio: God of War Ragnarök — PlayStation Showcase 2021 Reveal Trailer
 Excellence in Audio Accessibility: Blind Drive and Halo Infinite (tie)

 Music 
 Music of the Year: Marvel's Guardians of the Galaxy Creative and Technical Achievement in Music: Returnal Best Music for an Indie Game: Outer Wilds: Echoes of the Eye Best Original Soundtrack Album: It Takes Two Best Physical Soundtrack Release: Halo Infinite Best Main Theme: "Beneath Worlds" — Kena: Bridge of Spirits Best Original Song: "Déjà Vu" by Sencit and FJØRA — Deathloop Best Game Music Cover or Remix: "Gerudo Valley" — The Legend of Zelda: Ocarina of Time Sound Design 
 Sound Design of the Year: Returnal Creative and Technical Achievement in Sound Design: Ratchet & Clank: Rift Apart Best Game Foley: Call of Duty: Vanguard Best Sound Design for an Indie Game: Unpacking Best UI, Reward or Objective Sound Design: Ratchet & Clank: Rift Apart Voice Acting 
 Dialogue of the Year: Ratchet & Clank: Rift Apart Best Dialogue for an Indie Game: Disco Elysium: The Final Cut Best Voice Performance: Laura Bailey as Polina Petrova — Call of Duty: Vanguard Best Ensemble Cast Performance: Marvel's Guardians of the Galaxy Best Non-Humanoid Performance: Returnal Recognition 
 Lifetime Achievement Award: Leslie Ann Jones
 Distinguished Service Award: Sabrina Hutchinson
 Best Game Audio Article or Publication: Leading With Sound by Rob Bridgett
 Best Game Audio Presentation, Podcast or Broadcast: "Returnal with Loic Couthier & Toivo Kallio" — Tonebenders Sound Design Podcast''

21st (2023) 
The 21st annual G.A.N.G. Awards will take place on March 23, 2023. For the first time since 2019, the ceremony will return to the Moscone Center. Submissions opened on December 17, 2022, and nominees were announced on February 9, 2023. Paul Lipson, former G.A.N.G. president, will receive the Lifetime Achievement Award.

References 

Awards established in 2004
Video game awards